Andrew Walton (born c. 1945) was a Canadian football player who played for the Ottawa Rough Riders and Montreal Alouettes. He won the Grey Cup with Ottawa in 1969. He previously played college football at Jackson State University.

References

1940s births
Living people
Ottawa Rough Riders players
Montreal Alouettes players
American football running backs
Canadian football running backs
Jackson State Tigers football players